Hemiculter is a genus of cyprinid fish, consisting of eight  species native to fresh water of eastern Asia (Siberia to Vietnam).  The type species is the sharpbelly, Culter leucisculus.  The name is derived from the Greek word hemis, meaning "half", and the Latin word culter, meaning "knife".

Species 
 Hemiculter bleekeri Warpachowski, 1887
 Hemiculter elongatus V. H. Nguyễn & S. V. Ngô, 2001
 Hemiculter krempfi Pellegrin & Chevey, 1938
 Hemiculter leucisculus (Basilewsky, 1855) (sharpbelly)
 Hemiculter lucidus (Dybowski, 1872) (Ussuri sharpbelly)
 Hemiculter songhongensis V. H. Nguyễn & Nguyen, 2001
 Hemiculter tchangi P. W. Fang, 1942
 Hemiculter varpachovskii A. M. Nikolskii, 1903

References
 
 

 
Cyprinidae genera
Cyprinid fish of Asia